Charles Walton Wooldridge (August 10, 1897 – September 1982) was an American Negro league outfielder/first baseman in the 1920s.


Early life and career
A native of Allensville, Kentucky, Wooldridge made his Negro leagues debut in 1928 with the Cleveland Tigers. From 1931 through 1932, he played with the Scranton Progressive Colored Giants.

References

External links
 and Seamheads

1897 births
1982 deaths
Cleveland Tigers (baseball) players
Baseball players from Kentucky
People from Todd County, Kentucky
20th-century African-American sportspeople
Baseball outfielders